Papyrus Oxyrhynchus 287 (P. Oxy. 287 or P. Oxy. II 287) is a fragment of a Payment of Corn, in Greek. It was discovered in Oxyrhynchus. The manuscript was written on papyrus in the form of a sheet. It is dated to the 23 November 23. Currently it is housed in the library of the Columbia University (Head of Special Collections) in New York City.

Description 
The measurements of the fragment are 125 by 110 mm. The document is mutilated.

The document is a petition was written by an unknown author, and was addressed to the sitologi of a division of the lower toparchy.

This papyrus was discovered by Grenfell and Hunt in 1897 in Oxyrhynchus. The text was published by Grenfell and Hunt in 1899.

See also 
 Oxyrhynchus Papyri

References 

287
1st-century manuscripts